Elmsall may refer to:

Places
North Elmsall, a village and civil parish in West Yorkshire, England
South Elmsall, a small town and civil parish in West Yorkshire, England
 Moorhouse and South Elmsall Halt railway station (former)
 South Elmsall bus station
 South Elmsall railway station

People
William Elmsall, English politician

See also